Picrasma crenata, the pau-amargo, pau-tenente or tenente-josé, is a tree species that belongs to the family Simaroubaceae. It occurs in Brazil (in Atlantic Forest), in the regions  Nordeste (in Bahia state), Sudeste (in Minas Gerais, São Paulo and Rio de Janeiro states) and Sul (in Paraná, Santa Catarina and Rio Grande do Sul states).

References

crenata